Mark Allen (born 22 February 1986) is a Northern Irish professional snooker player from Antrim. He won the World Amateur Championship in 2004, turned professional the following year, and took only three seasons to reach the top 16. In his fourth professional season, he beat the defending champion Ronnie O’Sullivan en route to the semi-finals of the 2009 World Championship, where he lost to the eventual winner John Higgins.

Allen reached his first ranking final at the 2011 UK Championship, where he lost to Judd Trump. He won his first ranking title the following year at the 2012 World Open. He captured his first Triple Crown title when he defeated Kyren Wilson to win the 2018 Masters, and his second when he defeated Ding Junhui to win the 2022 UK Championship. He has won a career total of nine ranking titles. During the 2022–23 season so far, he has reached four ranking finals, won three ranking titles, and reached a career high of number three in the world rankings. 

A prolific break-builder, Allen has compiled more than 550 century breaks in professional competition. He has made two maximum breaks, achieving his first in the 2016 UK Championship and his second in the 2021 Northern Ireland Open qualifying round.

Career

Early career
At a young age, Allen considered a career in football, having trials with Sheffield Wednesday and Nottingham Forest before concentrating on snooker. Playing out of the Fountain Club in Antrim, he was Northern Ireland U14 champion in 2000, the U16 champion in 2001, before winning the Irish U16, U18 and U19 titles in one weekend in 2002, becoming the first player to win all three tournaments. By the age of 16 he had recorded his first maximum break and was a winner of the Golden Waistcoat, a tournament for the best U19 players from around the world.

He began his professional career by playing Challenge Tour in 2003, at the time the second-level professional tour. Before entering the Main Tour for the 2005–06 season, Allen won the European Championship and the IBSF World Championship, plus Northern Ireland Championship at under-14, under-16, and under-19 levels. His early career was aided by National Lottery funding.

By chance, an invitational Northern Ireland Trophy was staged shortly after Allen turned professional. As a local player, he was invited and made an immediate impact, defeating Steve Davis and John Higgins to reach the quarter-finals, before losing to Stephen Hendry. In his first year on the tour, he reached the last 32 of the 2005 UK Championship and the 2006 Welsh Open, losing 2–5 to the then World Champion Shaun Murphy after leading 2–0. He also got to the final qualifying round of the 2006 World Championship, losing 7–10 to Andy Hicks, after leading 7–4.

In March 2007 he qualified for the World Championship for the first time, winning three matches, culminating in a 10–4 win over Robert Milkins. In April 2007 he beat former world champion Ken Doherty 10–7 in the first round held at the Crucible Theatre in Sheffield, but lost to Matthew Stevens 9–13 in the second round. This was his first run to the last 16 of a tournament and helped him into the top 32 of the rankings (at no. 29).

In the 2007 Grand Prix, in a match with Ken Doherty, he was involved in an incident that led to his opponent branding him "a disgrace". Unhappy that the black would not go back on its spot after potting it, Allen struck the side cushion of the table with his fist. The referee told him that he would be warned if he did that again. Allen was not warned, and ended up winning the match. Doherty said, "He was a disgrace. For such a relative newcomer to the pro game, he's got a serious attitude problem". Allen later commented: "It was entirely my own fault and if there are going to be any repercussions then so be it." Allen did not reach the knockout stage of the tournament.

In the 2007 Northern Ireland Trophy he beat Graeme Dott and Ryan Day, 5–3 in each case, to reach his first ever quarter-final. There he defeated Gerard Greene 5–3 to reach the semi-final, where he lost 3–6 to Fergal O'Brien. In the following UK Championship he defeated Stephen Hendry in the last 32. He opened his last-16 match against Mark Williams with two centuries in the first three frames, building a 5–1 lead, but Williams fought back and he lost 5–9. He then reached the quarter-finals in the 2008 China Open before losing to Shaun Murphy. At the 2008 World Championship he led Stephen Hendry 6–3, 7–4 and 9–7 before losing 9–10. However, first-round defeats for all his rivals for a top-16 place ensured that he finished the season at number 16 in the rankings.

2009–2011 season
After a consistent season, Allen was back at the Crucible the following year where he beat Martin Gould in his opening match. He faced Ronnie O'Sullivan in the second round; confident and unaffected by his opponent's reputation, Allen beat the defending champion 13–11 for a quarter-final place in the 2009 World Championship. He then defeated Ryan Day by the same scoreline to reach the semi-finals, where he lost 13–17 to John Higgins, despite making a determined fightback from 3–13 down. Soon after his run in the World Championship, Allen won his first professional tournament, the 2009 Jiangsu Classic beating home favourite Ding Junhui 6–0 in the final.

During the 2010 Masters, Allen beat the World Champion, John Higgins, by 6–3 in the last 16, but lost 5–6 to eventual champion Mark Selby in the quarter-finals.

On the first day of the 2010 World Championship on 17 April 2010, Allen came close to recording his first ever maximum break in his first round match against Tom Ford after potting 15 reds with blacks, and the yellow, before breaking down on the green. Five days later, Allen made the first 146 break in World Championship history, and the second of his career after defeating Mark Davis 13–5 in the second round. He was defeated 12–13 in the quarter-final by Graeme Dott, having led 12–10.

At the 2010 UK Championship, Allen reached the semi-finals for the first time, where he was beaten 9–5 by eventual champion John Higgins. In the Masters, Allen again reached the semi-finals, and led Marco Fu 4–1 before Fu reeled off five frames in a row to win 6–4. At the 2011 World Championship, Allen entered as the 11th seed and played Matthew Stevens in the first round, recovering from 9–6 down and seeing Stevens miss a pot on the final pink to win the match 10–7, before winning 10–9. In the second round, Allen defeated Barry Hawkins 13–12. He reached the quarter-finals for the second year in a row but lost to Mark Williams 5–13.

2011/2012 season

The season began with Allen ranked world number 12 and he began it at the inaugural Australian Goldfields Open, where he beat Ryan Day and Marcus Campbell. Into the quarter finals, Allen was beaten by his rival Stuart Bingham 5–3. The next ranking event was the Shanghai Masters where Allen reached the second round and held a 4–2 advantage over Shaun Murphy before losing the next 3 frames and being edged out of the match 5–4. His steady start to the season meant that he maintained his world ranking of 12 after the first cut-off point.

Allen made it to his first ranking event final at the 2011 UK Championship by beating Adrian Gunnell, Ali Carter, Marco Fu and Ricky Walden. It was his first success in a ranking event semi-final, after having lost in all five prior attempts. In the final he played Judd Trump with whom he held a 2–1 advantage in the previous meetings between the pair. Allen opened up a 3–1 lead early in the best of 19 frames match, but subsequently lost the next seven frames to trail 3–8. However, such a deficit brought out the best in Allen as he won five of the next six frames, which included three centuries. The comeback was not quite completed though, as Trump secured the frame he required to take an 8–10 victory. Allen said after the final, "I knew it was going to be hard the way he was playing, he scores so heavy and so quickly and I didn't feel I was playing too bad but Judd played so well and it was hard to compete." Allen made five centuries during the tournament, the most of anyone in the event.

Allen lost the last four frames in the first round of the Masters to Neil Robertson having led 3–2 and stated afterwards that he had "completely lost interest" in the match. He accused the Australian of employing slow tactics and said that at times he didn't want to watch him play. He then exited the German Masters in the second round and lost to Shaun Murphy in the quarter-finals of the Welsh Open.

In March, Allen won his first ever ranking event as he captured the World Open title in Haikou, China. He beat qualifier Jimmy Robertson in the first round, before exacting revenge over Judd Trump for his defeat in York, by coming back from 0–3 down to triumph 5–4. He comfortably beat Mark King 5–1 in the quarter-finals, before producing another comeback from 2–5 down against world number 1 Mark Selby to win 6–5 and reach his second ranking final of the season. Allen played Stephen Lee in the final and dominated the encounter from start to finish as he won by 10 frames to 1. His season finished in disappointment, however, as he exited both the China Open and World Championship in the first round, to end the year where he started it, ranked world number 12.

2012/2013 season
Allen began the season with second round losses to Mark Williams at the Wuxi Classic and Judd Trump in the Shanghai Masters. His first title of the year soon followed at the minor-ranking Antwerp Open, by making three centuries in a 4–1 win over Mark Selby in the final. Allen then beat Robert Milkins and Cao Yupeng both 6–2 in the inaugural International Championship, before being edged out 5–6 by Trump in the quarter-finals. Marco Fu at the UK Championship beat Allen 6–3. At the Masters Allen came past Mark Davis 6–2, but was then narrowly beaten 5–6 by Neil Robertson in a high-quality encounter in the quarter-finals. At the Snooker Shoot-Out, the tournament where each match is decided by a 10-minute frame, Allen won through to the final where he lost to Martin Gould. He suffered successive second round defeats at the German Masters and the Welsh Open to Barry Hawkins and Ding Junhui respectively, before he travelled to China in an attempt to defend his World Open title from 2012. Allen comfortably won every match he played at the event as he beat Ryan Day 5–2, Robert Milkins 5–2, Ricky Walden 5–1, John Higgins 6–2 and Matthew Stevens 10–4 in the final to capture his second ranking title. Allen's Antwerp Open win from earlier in the season helped him finish eighth on the Players Tour Championship Order of Merit to qualify for the Finals where he lost 3–4 in the quarter-finals to Ding, who made a 147 and two further centuries during the match. Robertson beat Allen 5–1 in the second round of the China Open, and then Allen was the victim of a first round shock at the World Championship for a second year in a row as he lost to world number 30 Mark King 8–10, having led 8–6. Despite this, he climbed five spots in the rankings during the year to finish it ranked world number seven.

2013/2014 season

After losing in the first round of the opening two ranking events of the year, Allen won the minor-ranking Ruhr Open in Mülheim, Germany, by beating Ding Junhui 4–1 in the final. He also won the next European Tour event, the Kay Suzanne Memorial Cup by battling past former world champions Neil Robertson and Graeme Dott in the quarter-finals and semis respectively. He beat Judd Trump 4–1 in the final to become the first player to win back-to-back events since they were introduced in 2010. In the last 16 of the UK Championship, Allen and Judd Trump both struggled for consistency during their match, with Allen giving Trump a hug when the pair missed a succession of easy balls. Allen went on to win 6–4 to reach his first major quarter-final of the season, where he lost 6–2 to Ricky Walden. Allen came close to recording a hat-trick of World Open titles as he won through to the semi-finals, but was beaten 6–4 by Shaun Murphy. His two titles earlier in the season meant Allen was the number one seed for the PTC Finals where he lost in the quarter-finals 4–2 against Gerard Greene. Allen was 9–7 behind against Neil Robertson after the second session of his last 16 match at the World Championship and lost all four frames in the next session to be defeated 13–7. Afterwards, Allen tipped Robertson for the title saying he had faced perfect snooker from the Australian.

2014/2015 season

In August 2014, he reached the final of the Riga Open but lost 4–3 to Mark Selby. Two weeks later Allen won the Paul Hunter Classic defeating Judd Trump 4–2 in the final. He advanced to the final of the Shanghai Masters where he was beaten 10–3 by Stuart Bingham. At the International Championship, Allen led Mark Williams 7–4 by producing some of his best snooker which included a total of eight breaks above 50. However, Williams fought back to lead 8–7 before Allen came from 71–0 down and requiring two snookers to steal the next frame 73–71. Williams missed a tricky final red in the decider to allow Allen in to reach the final. In this match with Ricky Walden, there were never more than two frames between the players until from 7–7 Walden raced away to take the last three frames and condemn Allen to a second ranking event final defeat of the season. Despite taking a 3–0 lead over Rod Lawler with two centuries, Allen was knocked out 6–4 in the third round of the UK Championship.

He eliminated John Higgins and Joe Perry both 6–4 to play in the semi-finals of the Masters for the second time. Allen won the opening two frames against Shaun Murphy, but then lost six frames in a row. The rest of the season would prove to be disappointing for Allen as he couldn't advance beyond the last 16 of any event and after he lost the last five frames against Barry Hawkins in the second round of the World Championship to be beaten 13–11, he stated that the match had summed up his year as he was great in patches but overall came up short. He had not been coached by Terry Griffiths this season and Allen said that he was hopeful his form would improve next year by working with him again.

2015/2016 season
Allen reached the semi-finals of the Shanghai Masters with a 5–1 victory over Mark Davis, but was beaten 6–1 by Kyren Wilson. In the quarter-finals of the International Championship he compiled a 118 break to send the match into a deciding frame, but Thepchaiya Un-Nooh won it. Allen swept to the final of the Bulgarian Open by whitewashing Mark Williams 4–0 and did not drop a frame against Ryan Day either as he took home the title, his first in 15 months. The win qualified Allen for the Champion of Champions and he knocked out Barry Hawkins, Stephen Maguire and Wilson to reach another final, where he lost 10–5 to Neil Robertson. Robertson was also the victor when the pair met in the semi-finals of the Welsh Open, this time 6–4.

Allen came from 4–2 down against Shaun Murphy to win 6–4 and reach his first ranking event final of the season at the PTC Finals. He was 3–1 down to Ricky Walden, but a crucial run of six successive frames would be key as Allen won 10–6. He became the first Northern Irishman to win a ranking event in the UK since Dennis Taylor won the world title in 1985. Allen lost the opening seven frames against Kyren Wilson in the second round of the World Championship and was also 11–5 behind. He closed the gap to 11–9, but had left himself too much to do as he lost 13–9. Allen called the season a waste as he had not become the world champion.

2016/2017 season

Allen lost in the last 16 of the Paul Hunter Classic and the European Masters 4–3 to Thepchaiya Un-Nooh and 4–2 to Ronnie O'Sullivan respectively. He made three centuries to eliminate Mark Selby 6–5 at the inaugural China Championship 5–4, but was then heavily beaten 9–3 by John Higgins. A week later he defeated Selby by the same scoreline and stage at the Champion of Champions, before losing 6–2 to O'Sullivan.

Allen's only ranking event quarter-final this season came at his home event the Northern Ireland Open, but he lost 5–2 to Anthony Hamilton. He made the first 147 of his career during his 6–4 win over Rod Lawler in the second round of the UK Championship and then recovered from 4–0 down to eliminate Ryan Day 6–5. Allen was knocked out 6–3 by John Higgins in the fourth round, losing the final four frames of the match. He exacted some revenge by edging out Higgins 6–5 in the opening round of the Masters, before being defeated 6–2 by Marco Fu. He met Higgins again in the second round of the World Championship and, though Allen made four centuries and seven other breaks above 50, he was beaten 13–9.

2017/2018 season
Allen´s first tournament where he played was International Championship. He´s got to final on first try, but lost to Mark Selby 7-10. This was his first and last participation in a ranking final at the same time in this season. Later he added a semi-final in World open and other quarter-final in European Masters.

However, Allen succeeded in the Masters beating Luca Brecel, Ronnie O'Sullivan, John Higgins and runner-up Kyren Wilson 10-7. This was the only tournament victory for Allen in this season. In World championship, he finished in last 8. His opponent in quarter-final was Kyren Wilson again, but this time Allen was beaten 6-13 by him.

2018/2019 season
Although Allen didn't succeed in the final of International championship in previous season, this time he did. In the final, he met with Neil Robertson and beat him comfortably 10-5 and also made a highest break (146). But after this triumph followed a few unsatisfactory results. Despite of them, Allen reached UK Championship final after a won decider in semi-final against Stuart Bingham at the start of December. His opponent was a defending champion Ronnie O'Sullivan, who won over Allen 10-6.

Just after UK championship Allen added his 5th ranking victory by winning last tournament in year 2018 Scottish open by defeating Shaun Murphy in the final.

But in the second half of the season, Allen wasn't able to get further than semi-final. Allen suffered a failure in World championship, because he lost in first round against Zhou Yuelong.

Despite the negative outcomes, he won more than one ranking tournament in his career for the first time and reached his highest ranking, fifth, in March 2019.

2019/2020 season

Allen could not reach a final in the first half of the season, he lost in all six semi-finals which he reached. In International Championship and Shanghai Masters Allen lost against Shaun Murphy, in English open against Mark Selby and in Champion of champions lost to Judd Trump. In the UK Championship, he suffered a whitewash from Stephen Maguire. Allen's attempt to regain his Scottish open title in 2018 ended in the decider of the semi-final match against Jack Lisowski. At the World Championship Allen equalled the record of making 5 centuries in a first round match against qualifier Jamie Clarke; however, he went on to lose the match against the Welsh number 89 - the lowest ranked player in the tournament- 8-10. He ended the season where he finished the last one, ranked number 5.

2020/2021 season 
Allen's most notable achievement during the 2020/2021 season was winning the 2020 Champion of Champions. He defeated Ronnie O'Sullivan in a contentious quarter-final that saw O'Sullivan accusing Allen of deliberately standing in his line of sight and Allen accusing O'Sullivan of being a 'bully'. Allen went on to defeat Judd Trump in the semi-finals and Neil Robertson 10–6 in the final.

2021/2022 season 
In the 2021/2022 season, Allen won his first Northern Ireland Open title, coming from 6–8 behind in the final to defeat John Higgins 9–8. Earlier in the tournament, in his qualifying round match against Si Jiahui, he made the second maximum break of his professional career.

2022/2023 season 

In this phenomenal season for Allen, he won three ranking events to date and also reached a further final and a semifinal.
He won the UK Championship 2022 10–7 against Ding Junhui, coming back from 1–6 behind.

Rivalry
Allen has had a rivalry with Stuart Bingham. After Bingham squandered a 12–9 lead in the second round of the 2011 World Snooker Championship to lose 13–12 against Ding Junhui, Allen stated that Bingham had "no bottle" and admitted that there was history between the players and that they did not get on. Bingham responded by calling Allen an idiot and the tension between the two was clearly high as they were drawn to play each other in the second round of the 2011 Australian Goldfields Open. Before the match, Bingham said that he couldn't wait to play and that he had been waiting for it for a long time. He also stated that he didn't care what Allen thought and it would give him more pleasure to beat him. Bingham fulfilled his pre-match words by defeating Allen 5–3 and also went on to win the tournament by coming back from 8–5 down to beat Mark Williams 9–8 in the final. 

When the draw for the 2011 UK Championship was made it revealed that there was a potential quarter-final clash between the two. Anticipating the meeting, Bingham said that the "feud was not over" and that he would be staying away from Allen and not be speaking to him until they next played. The match-up was avoided, however, when Bingham lost in the first round to Marco Fu. Allen announced before the start of the 2013 World Championship that there was no problem between himself and Bingham since Bingham had proved him wrong by winning tournaments, and the two have had drinks and dinner together. After Bingham won the 2015 World Championship he said "Thanks to Mark Allen. He said I had no bottle and since then things have changed".

Allen also has a rivalry with Mark Joyce and has made no secret of his dislike for him, stating that: "I don't like Mark Joyce, basically he is a dick, on and off the table, I doubt even his mum likes him." He went on to accuse Joyce of gamesmanship during their match at the 2016 Northern Irish Open.

Controversy
In a post-match press conference after his first round win in the 2011 UK Championship, Allen called for the chairman of the World Professional Billiards and Snooker Association (WPBSA), Barry Hearn, to resign. Allen's reasoning for this was based upon his belief that Hearn had promised not to alter the structure of any of the major snooker tournaments in the calendar (the World Snooker Championships, the UK Championships and the Masters) when he was appointed chairman in June 2010, whereas in fact the UK Championship had seen matches decided on a best-of-11-frames basis, rather than the best-of-17-frames used in previous years. Allen also stated his perception that the crowd atmosphere within snooker was turning into that of one usually associated with darts and that the tradition of snooker was "going to pot". Allen then swore when talking about Hearn at a press conference.
The WPBSA announced that Allen would be facing a disciplinary committee for swearing when talking about Hearn and that he could be charged with bringing the game into disrepute. Hearn himself responded by saying he was "far too busy to worry about silly little boys making silly little comments". Upon learning that Hearn had been on holiday for the entirety of the event, Allen said it was a "joke" and only confirmed the views which he had expressed earlier in the week. The pair held a meeting in January 2012, to settle their differences ahead of the forthcoming Masters tournament. Hearn said after the meeting that the way he was running the game may not suit everyone, but his concern was the game of snooker in general. Hearn added: "Mark's prize money this year is probably double what he's earned in the last couple of years so I must be doing something right. We had a very frank and friendly exchange of views and in the end I think he saw my point of view, but time will tell." Allen was fined £250 for his actions by the WPBSA later in the month.

Just two months later while playing in the World Open in Haikou, China, Allen described the conditions on his Twitter page as "horrendous", following up with: "Journey a nightmare. People are ignorant. Place stinks. Arena's rubbish, tables poor, food is horrendous. Other than that I love China", although this tweet was later deleted. Answering critics of that particular tweet, he said they should "get a life". World Snooker described his remarks as very disappointing. It was later revealed that Allen was fined £1,000 for his criticism and he went on to close his Twitter account in April. He later reopened it and used it for some time but proceeded to close it again for most of 2020, citing repeat issues of abuse and trolling that have disrupted his game. As of late 2020, it has since been reopened.

Following his defeat at the 2012 World Snooker Championship to Chinese qualifier Cao Yupeng, he openly accused his opponent of cheating and unsporting behaviour for not owning up to what he perceived to be a foul. Allen attributed the deception to his perceived cultural differences between British and Chinese players, purportedly with incidents involving Chinese professional Liang Wenbo and Hong Kong's Marco Fu. Barry Hearn confirmed that Allen would once again face a disciplinary process and said that the player's actions had left him "speechless". Allen was fined a total of £11,000 and warned he would be suspended from the tour for three months if he breached the rules again in the following six months. He was also required to undergo media training.

Prior to the commencement of the 2013 World Snooker Championship, Allen renewed his criticisms of Barry Hearn. Allen voiced concerns that the World Snooker Tour's increasing emphasis on events in China was pricing players out of competing, pointing out that since Hearn took over the running of the game players now have to pay for their own flights, which can incur extra expenses of £10,000–£15,000 per season. Allen, who earned £278,000 over the course of the previous two years, further added he did not believe he was being fairly compensated for his services.

At the 2019 World Grand Prix, he conceded the match against Ali Carter in the fifth frame with 11 reds on the table after missing the yellow.

Personal life
In 2005, Allen began a relationship with women's world snooker champion Reanne Evans. They had a daughter, born in 2006, but ended their relationship in 2008. Following his breakup with Evans, Allen fell into a deep depression and had periods where he did not leave his home. He spoke openly about his vulnerability to depression and loneliness at this time, partly due to the amount of travelling required of a top professional snooker player.

In 2011, Allen met Kyla McGuigan, whom he married on 10 May 2013. Allen's stepson Robbie McGuigan became a noted amateur snooker player, winning under-16 and under-21 tournaments at an early age and achieving a 147 break in 2018 at the age of 13. Allen and McGuigan's daughter Harleigh was born in 2017. In May 2020, it was reported that Allen and McGuigan had separated and were in the process of divorcing. In May 2021, he declared himself bankrupt. In 2022, following his divorce from McGuigan, he became engaged to Aideen Cassidy. 

Following a conversation with fellow professional Ronnie O'Sullivan and concern from friends, Allen lost four stone (approx. 25 kg) after the 2022 World Snooker Championship. Before his weight loss, Allen had weighed 19 stone (approx. 120 kg).

During the COVID-19 pandemic, he spent three to four hours a day delivering groceries and prescription medications to vulnerable people in Antrim.

Performance and rankings timeline

Career finals

Ranking finals: 17 (9 titles)

Minor-ranking finals: 6 (5 titles)

Non-ranking finals: 7 (3 titles)

Team finals: 2 (1 title)

Pro-am finals: 5 (4 titles)

Amateur finals: 6 (5 titles)

References

External links

Mark Allen at worldsnooker.com
 
 Player profile on Global Snooker

1986 births
Living people
Snooker players from Northern Ireland
People from Antrim, County Antrim
People educated at Antrim Grammar School
Masters (snooker) champions
Competitors at the 2005 World Games